Unidos (lit. United) was a political party in Guatemala.

History
The political party was registered by the Supreme Electoral Tribunal in 2015 with the necessary affiliates. On September 25, 2015, the Supreme Electoral Tribunal authorized its registration to qualify it as a political party. On February 21, 2016, it held its first Assembly.

Presidential elections

References

External links

2015 establishments in Guatemala
2020 disestablishments in Guatemala
Centrist parties in North America
Defunct political parties in Guatemala
Political parties disestablished in 2020
Political parties established in 2015